The women's individual pursuit competition at the 2022 UEC European Track Championships was held on 13 August 2022.

Results

Qualifying
The first two racers raced for gold, the third and fourth fastest rider raced for the bronze medal.

Finals

References

Women's individual pursuit
European Track Championships – Women's individual pursuit